Huỳnh Nguyễn Mai Phương (born 30 September 1999) is a Vietnamese model and beauty pageant titleholder who was crowned Miss World Vietnam 2022. She will represent Vietnam at the Miss World 2023 pageant.

Mai Phương was also crowned Miss Dongnai University 2018, and placed Top 5 finalist at Miss Vietnam 2020 with the Beauty with a Purpose award.

Early life and education 
Mai Phương was born in Đồng Nai, Vietnam. Since childhood, Mai Phuong studied very well. She won the second prize for excellent English students at the provincial level in 2016, the third prize in English at the provincial level in 2017. In the 11th grade, Mai Phuong achieved an IELTS score of 6.5 that many people admired.

While a student of Dong Nai University, Mai Phuong successfully won the title of Miss University in 2018.

Currently, she is working in parallel with many jobs. Including bilingual MC and photo model. She is also a collaborator in Vietnam Television.

Pageantry

Miss Đồng Nai University 2018 
In 2018, Mai Phuong was crowned as the winner of Miss Đồng Nai University 2018. This is the first pageant she have attended.

Miss Vietnam 2020 
She continued to compete at Miss Vietnam 2020 and placed Top 5 at the pageants with the special award Beauty with a Purpose.

Miss World Vietnam 2022 
In 2022, she returned to the beauty pageants at Miss World Vietnam 2022 and won.

Miss World 2023 
She will represent Vietnam at the Miss World 2023 pageant.

References

External links

1999 births
Living people
Miss World 2022 delegates
People from Đồng Nai Province
Vietnamese female models
Vietnamese beauty pageant winners
21st-century Vietnamese women